Freshman Year is the debut album of Canadian country music duo the Reklaws. It was released on August 27, 2019, via Universal Music Canada. It includes their #1 hit "Feels Like That", as well as the singles "Hometown Kids", "Long Live the Night", "I Do Too", and "Old Country Soul".

Singles 
"Hometown Kids" was released as their debut radio single in June 2017, and became their first charting entry on the Billboard Canada Country chart, peaking at #16.

"Long Live the Night" was the second single to radio in February 2018. It peaked at #6 on Canadian country radio and was certified Platinum by Music Canada. The song was released as part of a three-track, digital single that included "Wish You Were Beer" and "Last Call". A modified version of the track was made for the Canadian Football League and used as the theme song for the national TV broadcast Thursday Night Football on CFL on TSN in 2018 and 2019.

"Feels Like That" was released as the third single to radio in August 2018. It became their first #1 on Canadian country radio and was certified Gold by Music Canada. It was released as part of the seven-track EP, Feels Like That, that also included "Raised by the Radio" and "Missing You", as well as the three tracks from the Long Live the Night single and "Hometown Kids".

"I Do Too" was released as the fourth single to radio in March 2019. It peaked at #6 on the Canada Country chart, and became their first entry on the Canadian Hot 100, peaking at #98. It was certified Gold by Music Canada.

"Old Country Soul" was released as the fifth single to radio off the album in September 2019. It peaked at #4 on the Canada Country chart and #87 on the Canadian Hot 100. It was certified Platinum by Music Canada.

Track listing

Charts

Album

Singles

Certifications

Release history

Notes

References 

2019 debut albums
The Reklaws albums
Universal Music Canada albums
Albums produced by Todd Clark